Ayesha River is an intermittent river of eastern Ethiopia. Its drainage basin is part of the East African Rift.

Overview
The Ethiopian Ministry of Water Resources lists the drainage area of the Ayesha amongst the twelve major basins in the country, with an area of 2,223 square kilometers, although it lacks any measurable flow.

References

Rivers of Ethiopia